Mathi Mathi may be:
The Muthi Muthi people
The Madhi Madhi language